The Murasaki Shikibu Prize is a Japanese literary award awarded annually to an outstanding piece of literature in Japanese by a female author. It was established in 1991 by the city of Uji in Kyoto Prefecture in honor of Murasaki Shikibu's deep connection to the city of Uji. It awards a cash prize of 2 million yen, as well as a bronze statuette.

Winners

References 

Japanese literary awards
Awards established in 1991
Japanese-language literary awards
Literary awards honoring women